Arbonne International, LLC, known as Arbonne, is an international multi-level marketing company founded in 1980 in the United States by Norwegian entrepreneur Petter Mørck. Its product lines include vegan skincare, cosmetics, and nutrition. Arbonne's CEO is Tyler Whitehead, who succeeded Jean-David Schwartz in April 2021. Arbonne is headquartered in Irvine, California, US, with US offices in Chatsworth, California, Greenwood, Indiana, Addison, Texas, and international offices in Australia, Canada, New Zealand, Poland, and the United Kingdom.

History 
Founded in Orem, Utah, United States by Mørck in 1980, Arbonne is named after the Swiss village of Arbon. Mørck had worked in the Norwegian skincare industry since 1965. In 1975, feeling the ingredients used were harmful to the skin, he moved to Arbon and started working on his skincare line with Pierre Bottiglieri, an employee of Laboratoires Cosmetiques Arval.

The first headquarters were located in Orem, Utah, moving to Irvine in 1984. Mørck was active in the company until his death in 2008. His son, Stian Mørck, is currently Brand Ambassador. Rita Davenport became the company's first President from 1991 to 2011. Arbonne  became a subsidiary of Levlad, Inc., which became the main manufacturer of Arbonne products around 2004. In 2005, both companies were acquired by Harvest Partners, which dubbed the new acquisition Natural Products Group, LLC. In February 2018, Groupe Rocher, Paris, agreed to acquire Arbonne International and Nature's Gate from Natural Products Group.

The company made $200 million in sales in 2004. In 2005 there were 434,000 independent consultants, increasing to 612,000 in 2006. In 2006, Arbonne established distribution centers in Greenwood, Indiana, and near Calgary, Alberta. This was in addition to an existing distribution center in Mississauga, Ontario. Between 2007 and 2009, the number of the company's consultants fell from 1.3 million to under 800,000. In January 2010, Natural Products Group LLC filed for bankruptcy protection in order to reduce company debts. Harvest Partners were no longer involved, with Arbonne's new ownership being a combination of banks and private equity firms.

In 2006, Arbonne opened for business in Canada, then Australia in 2007, and the United Kingdom in 2008. In 2014, the company launched Arbonne Poland, and then both New Zealand and Taiwan in 2016.

In March 2018, Arbonne was acquired by Groupe Rocher.

They have been accused of being a pyramid scheme due to their strong emphasis on recruitment.

Products 
Products are formulated at the Arbonne Institute of Research and Development (AIRD) in Switzerland and produced in the United States. A 2006 article in The Virginian-Pilot highlighted questions about whether AIRD not having their own facilities was proper and noted that chemist Pierre Bottiglieri might have worked for multiple companies besides Arbonne. Bloomberg.com lists no address for the AIRD.

Business Model 

Arbonne is structured on a multi-level marketing model. The products are sold via home-based businesses owned and operated by independent consultants. Independent consultants are not employees and are viewed differently by the United States Internal Revenue Service. Arbonne is a member of the Direct Selling Association.

In 2012, The Arbonne Charitable Foundation was registered as a charity to support programs to help teenagers build and increase their self-confidence. The Foundation has charitable status within the U.S., Canada, Australia and the UK.

Lawsuits and FTC Action 
Lawsuits have been filed against Arbonne concerning discrimination. In April 2020, Arbonne received a warning letter from the US Federal Trade Commission in response to illegal health claims made by business opportunity participants or representatives related to the Coronavirus Disease 2019 (COVID-19) as well as false and misleading income claims made by Arbonne distributors. In November 2009, the U.S. District Court for the Southern District of Indiana ruled that Arbonne International LLC violated federal law. The company refused to employ Lisa Wilson on the grounds of her disability (deafness). Arbonne paid a US$30,000 settlement to Wilson and was required to institute non-discrimination policies and training.

In May 2017, Cynthia and Michael Dagnall raised a lawsuit against Arbonne in the Orange County Superior Court. They alleged that the company was an illegal pyramid scheme. The Arbonne Pyramid Scheme Class Action Lawsuit was dismissed on March 20, 2018.

Recalls 
In January 2009, Arbonne voluntarily recalled some production lots of branded peanut butter cups. This was due to the risk of possible Salmonella serotype Typhimurium contamination of peanut-based products consigned from a Georgia processing plant.

In September 2009, Arbonne voluntarily recalled a production lot of branded foaming sea salt scrub, due to the risk of contamination with Pseudomonas aeruginosa bacteria.

In January 2013, Health Canada advised of Arbonne's voluntary recall of one batch of branded facial moisturizer for men. Arbonne's testing found that the batch contained the bacterium Aerococcus viridans.

In January 2014, the Australian Competition & Consumer Commission (ACCC) recalled sample tubes of branded day cream due to the presence of the bacterium Enterobacter gergoviae.

In June 2016, Arbonne voluntarily recalled multiple lots of branded liquid eye liner. The products contained unacceptable levels of the bacteria Staphylococcus saprophyticus, Staphylococcus xylosus, and Staphylococcus lentus.

In October 2017, the ACCC recalled one lot of branded body wash due to unacceptable levels of Staphylococcus cohnii.

References 

Privately held companies of the United States
Multi-level marketing companies
Direct sales companies
Personal selling
Companies established in 1980
1980 establishments in California